is a horror manga series written by Eiji Ōtsuka and drawn by Housui Yamazaki. First published in Kadokawa Mystery, the series later (October 2006) transferred to the companion publication Shōnen Ace, and now published in the magazine Young Ace. As of March 2021, 28 volumes have been published in Japan.

An English adaptation is published by Dark Horse Comics. It was first published in individual volumes until volume 14. The english adaptation then entered a long hiatus until the series was rereleased in an omnibus edition format collecting three volumes into a single book, including newly translated material.

The series follows five recently graduated university students who have formed a company which specializes in dealing with the dead and their last wishes.

A U.S. live-action film based on The Kurosagi Corpse Delivery Service is in development.

Plot, setting and structure
The series deals with the exploits of five young graduates of a Buddhist college, all of which have a special skill, some of them supernatural and/or involving dead bodies. Most notable is Kuro Karatsu who has the ability to "speak" to the recently deceased and hear their last wishes. On this basis the group forms a business venture to fulfill said wishes in hopes for compensation. However, because corpses do not always die of natural causes or accidents, the group often encounters criminal activity or such compensation is unattainable.

The series is ostensibly set in modern-day Japan with the main characters hanging around the Buddhist college near Tokyo the main characters attended, though the characters often travel elsewhere for summer jobs or to fulfill their "clients" wishes. Tokyo, usually Shinjuku, is often visited though it is not known exactly where the college is located in relation to the greater Tokyo metropolitan area. The manga also seems to be set in the same universe as MPD Psycho and Mail, other series that the authors Otsuka and Yamazaki respectively have worked on, as characters of these series appear in it.

The Kurosagi Corpse Delivery Service is structured into self-contained chapters though some successive stories, most notably the entire second volume, are one continuous story. This changes in later volumes due to a change in serialization. The stories stay self-contained, but span two or three chapters which have fewer pages than chapters at the start of the series. Most chapters are named after a Japanese pop song with each chapter in a single volume usually named for songs by the same artist. The English release by Dark Horse Comics is notable for extensive translation notes and explanations in the back of the manga. An example would be information about the artists of the songs the chapters are named for.

Starting with Volume 3 each volume of the manga features a structural drawing of a body on the cover that is relevant to one of the stories within. The cover and backcover also features a depiction of all the company members. However, only Karatsu gets a mugshot on each cover while the other characters may appear in some other manner or are hinted at. Above this depiction they are only identified as "Staff A" through "Staff E" (with the felt puppet Kere Ellis being "Staff E'") and a description of their skill underneath. In the Japanese edition, the volumes come with a dust jacket using a paper stock similar to brown wrapping paper. Dark Horse attempted to emulate this cover style by using a similar stock for the cover of the English edition. However, starting with volume 12 Dark Horse switched to a glossier paper stock for cost cutting reasons. The original stock was reintroduced for the Omnibus versions.

Characters

The Kurosagi Corpse Delivery Service
 A student Buddhist monk with average grades who shaves his head. He has the ability to "speak" with the recently deceased by the means of touching their bodies, allowing the team to learn their "clients'" desires. This skill develops over the course of the series and is linked to a spirit lingering near him named Yaichi. Involuntarily this can also lead to a temporary reanimation of the dead body touched and corpses in the immediate area, although Karatsu has no control over their actions afterwards. He is sometimes classified as an itako, although he is neither a woman nor blind.
 The brains behind the company, a tall woman with long black hair. A skilled hacker and general computer expert. She also has a large information network and sometimes uses bribes (such as pictures of dead idols) as the means to achieve the ends. This includes running an Internet chat-room entitled "Corpse-Chat". Besides collecting pictures of dead bodies, she also seems to enjoy literature and has recently started to attend a few psychology courses at the university.
 He uses a pendulum to dowse for the dead which enables him to find the bodies needed for the team's delivery work. Numata puts on a tough guy image including leather jackets and sunglasses, although he enjoys sides of Japanese pop culture which are rarely associated with such an image, such as interest in Japanese idol singers. He is the physically strongest of the group, but also tends to be the most emotional.
 A licensed embalmer who handles the corpses found by Karatsu and Numata. She studied her trade in America since embalmers are rare in Japan, where most bodies are cremated rather than buried. She has blonde hair and is very fashion conscious, never seen in the same outfit more than once (often Punk fashion), and also works with her skills on part-time jobs, for example for on an American military base.
 A timid guy who wears a felt puppet on his left hand which he claims channels an alien intelligence. He is a big nerd fond of advanced mathematics, folklore, and his apartment is filled with various sci-fi and most notably Star Wars memorabilia. Like Sasaki, he is also fairly knowledgeable about literature and urban legends. Yata's eyes are rarely seen as his hair almost always covers them.
 A very foul-mouthed alien life form which communicates through Yata's hand puppet, though the group is at least in the beginning very skeptical if this alien isn't Yata himself or a split personality express via ventriloquism. Yata often apologizes for Kere Ellis' unruly behavior but has his left hand physically abused in reaction to the alien's verbal attacks nonetheless. The design of the Kere Ellis puppet changed significantly from the first chapter to the second but remained constant since.
 Yaichi is a spirit that seems to follow around Karatsu if not outright possessing him. He may be the source of Karatsu's ability or at least be able to amplify it to a great extent. The most notable of Yaichi's features are his long white hair and the severe scars on his face. One scar starts at the center-top of the face and runs down between the eyes and then down the right side. It is met below the eye by another scar coming from the right ear. A third scar runs across the left cheek starting from the corner of the mouth. Though there is no direct interaction or awareness with the group, he often helps the group with warnings or taking over some of the body movement of various characters who feel his presence during that period.

The Shirosagi Corpse Cleaning Service
The Shirosagi Corpse Cleaning Service is a mysterious organization that on the surface is in the business to clean up murder and suicide sites. However, it appears that they are secretly after Karatsu's spirit Yaichi.
 This man has the same scars as Yaichi only his hair is black except for a patch white hair above his right eye. Sasayama remarked after giving a description that he looks very much like , a former police coroner and serial killer Sasayama shot when he was still a cop. However, Sasayama killed Zuhaku and also witnessed his burial and thus concludes that they can not be the same person. Sasayama also remarked that the name "Ichiro Suzuki" is probably fake. When conducting business as a corpse cleaner Suzuki wears a white jumpsuit, baseball cap, safety goggles and a breathing mask, obscuring his face almost completely.
The Girl A small, black-haired girl with a big bow in her hair usually wearing a kimono with a black leather Obi. Her character has not been named in the translated parts of story so far. She seems to be Suzuki's partner in their more nefarious activities and possesses some spiritual powers of her own, e.g. limited Telekinetic powers and the ability to converse with a group of spirits.

Other recurring characters
 Sasayama is a character by Otsuka that also appeared in MPD Psycho. In this instance he is a lot older, has a large scar on his bald head and walks with cane due to a pegleg which is evidence for Kurosagi being set years after MPD Psycho. Initially the group thinks he is a Yakuza. He is no longer a police officer but instead works for the Shinjuku municipal social welfare office and often has trouble with unidentified bodies for which he asks the group for help, usually taking advantage of them. Also, he gives them odd jobs on occasion.
 A nurse trainee with the ability to hear the last words of a spirit before it passes on. She has two separate encounters with the Kurosagi team and seems to be romantically interested in Karatsu.
 Mr. Nire is an entrepreneur in post-mortem services. At times he has run a funeral home, a mummification service and a cryogenic preservation facility, though many of his business ventures are somewhat shady. He knew about the Kurosagi Corpse Delivery Service before they met and tried to recruit them for his business.
 Mr. Nire's business partner in later exploits. He appears as a tall man usually in a hooded jacket. He is also covered in bandages which is explained by Mr. Nire as due to being a victim of an accident and having suffered severe burns. However, Shinuhe has also joked about being an actual resurrected Egyptian Mummy. Regardless of that, he seems to be fond of ancient Egypt either way and very knowledgeable about the process of mummification which he is eager to share.
 The adopted daughter of Mr. Nire. She has the unique ability to raise the dead for short periods of time, often with undesirable results.
Reina Gorn A forensic entomology student from America (Ohio, to be exact) that the group meets and befriends. Her unique accent makes speaking Japanese a bit awkward. She has a fascination with insects, as well.
 Akiba is a character by Yamazaki that also appeared in Mail (manga). He is a detective who also describes himself as a medium. He uses a pistol called Kagutsuchi which seals ghosts within his bullets.  
The crying woman An unnamed elderly woman with the ability to affect other people around her and force them into involuntary crying. She appears to know about Yaichi and the Shirosagi Corpse Cleaning Service and is an acquaintance of Sasayama.
 Sasaki's psychotherapist who occasionally is asked by the Kurosagis to help them with a case. She apparently chose psychiatry due to her failings in medicine and reluctance to work with the physical human body. Nevertheless, she seems to be unfazed by Karatsu's ability. Though young looking Sasaki stated that Jenny is as old as Sasayama.
,  and  Three robotics students who have had repeated encounters with the KCDS by attempting to use corpses for their inventions, usually with not that great results. The trio is named after Yoshiyuki Tomino, Go Nagai and Osamu Tezuka, all of which have been called founders of subgenres of Mecha anime and manga.

List of chapters

Other appearances
Karatsu and Makino appeared in the movie adaptation of the Fatal Frame series which was released on September 26, 2014.

References

External links
 Dark Horse official site
 

2002 manga
Comics about death
Dark Horse Comics titles
Horror anime and manga
Kadokawa Shoten manga
Seinen manga
Shōnen manga